Macroscelesia is a genus of moths in the family Sesiidae.

Species
Macroscelesia japona (Hampson, 1919)
Macroscelesia longipes (Moore, 1877)
Macroscelesia longipes longipes (Moore, 1877)
Macroscelesia longipes yamatoensis Arita, 1992
Macroscelesia aritai  Kallies & Garrevoet, 2001
Macroscelesia diaphana  Gorbunov & Arita, 1995
Macroscelesia elaea (Hampson, 1919)
Macroscelesia formosana  Arita & Gorbunov, 2002
Macroscelesia owadai  Arita & Gorbunov, 2000
Macroscelesia sapaensis  Kallies & Arita, 2004
Macroscelesia vietnamica  Arita & Gorbunov, 2000

References

Sesiidae